Kwigiumpainukamiut is a ghost town in Bethel Census Area, Alaska, United States located between Chuathbaluk and Napaimute, directly across the river from Kolmakoff Island. In the early spring, it is covered with tan-colored grass and is easier to see.

Further reading
 The Kwig Dig: The Kwigiumpainukamiut Archeology Project (see here)
 

Geography of Bethel Census Area, Alaska
Ghost towns in Alaska